Surniinae is a subfamily of the typical owls (Strigidae). First described by French ornithologist Charles Lucien Bonaparte in 1838. The type genus is Surnia. Includes ten genera.

Classification 

Surniinae includes ten genera (one extinct), from which five (Xenoglaux, Micrathene, Surnia, Uroglaux, Sceloglaux) are monotypic.

 Genus Xenoglaux — long-whiskered owlet
 Genus Micrathene — elf owl
 Genus Aegolius
 Genus Athene
 Genus Surnia
 Genus Glaucidium — pygmy owls
 Genus Ninox
 Genus Taenioptynx
 Genus Uroglaux — Papuan hawk-owl
 Genus †Sceloglaux — laughing owl

References

Further reading 

Strigidae
Bird subfamilies